"Savages" is a song by American electronic music group Breathe Carolina. It was released on November 25, 2013, as the lead single from their fourth studio album Savages. The song serves as the title track of their fourth album and is the first song released by the band since Kyle Even's departure.

Composition
"Savages" was written by David Schmitt, Kyle Even, Eric Armenta, Tommy Cooperman and Luis Bonet whilst production was handled by Ian Kirkpatrick who also co-wrote the song. The track still has the same sound as the group's last album incorporating mixes of a house-influenced drop, focusing heavily on the bass and a pulsing electronic beat with lyrics about youth and living life to its fullest. The group premiered a lyrics video to the song on November 26, 2013. The track runs at 126 BPM and is in the key of D major. In 2016, the group released a mashup remix to "Savages" for free along with another single "Giants" on Beatport.

Reception
"Savages" was received with mostly positive reviews. Andrew Wendowski of Music Mayhem Magazine gave a positive review calling the song "catchy and fun." He stated, "'Savages', I feel is very balanced vocally and instrumentally; there isn’t too much of one thing. I do like the song lyrically as well." Kriston McConnell of Under the Gun Review gave a mixed review complimenting the song for its "catchy, repetitive chorus," however was critical of the songs creativity. She ended off stating, "it's definitely fun and I certainly look forward to hearing what else they have in store for us, but I do not feel this is the best song they have put out in recent years."

Track listing
Digital download

Remix version

Charts

Release history

References

2013 singles
2013 songs
Fearless Records singles
Songs written by Ian Kirkpatrick (record producer)